1st Medical Battalion is a unit of the United States Marine Corps operated by the United States Navy that provides expeditionary Health Service Support to Marine Corps forces forward deployed to operations or humanitarian missions.  The unit is based out of Marine Corps Base Camp Pendleton and falls under the command of 1st Marine Logistics Group.

Mission
Provides expeditionary health service support to the operating units of the First Marine Expeditionary Force to preserve and save every life and support the war fighting capability of the MEF.

Subordinate units
 Headquarters and Services Company (HSC)
 Surgical Company A (A Company)
 Surgical Company B (B Company)
 Surgical Company C (C Company)

Each lettered Surgical Company consists of 4 Surgical Platoons that provide Role 2 Light Maneuver capabilities consisting of command and control, damage control resuscitation, damage control surgery, limited patient holding, radiology, laboratory and blood banking capabilities and MEDEVAC personnel and equipment. Typically, the Surgical Companies and Surgical Platoons are task organized to support the full range of Special Purpose Marine Air Ground Task Force units.

History

1940 - 1941

Activated 06 September 1940 at Quantico, Virginia, as the 1st Medical Battalion and assigned to the 1st Marine Brigade.

Deployed during October 1940 to Guantanamo Bay, Cuba

Reassigned during February 1941 to the 1st Marine Division

Relocated during April 1941 to Quantico, Virginia, and Parris Island, South Carolina

Relocated during September 1941 to New River, North Carolina

1942 - 1947

Deployed during June - July 1942 to Wellington, New Zealand

Participated in the following World War II campaigns 
Guadalcanal
Eastern New Guinea
New Britain
Peleliu
Okinawa

Participated in the occupation of North China, September 1945 - May 1947

Redeployed during May 1947 to Guam

1947 - 1964

Reactivated 16 July 1947 at Camp Pendleton, California, and assigned to the 1st Marine Division, Fleet Marine Force

Deployed during August 1950 to Kobe, Japan

Participated in the Korean War, September 1950 - July 1953, operating from 
Inchon-Seoul
Chosin Reservoir
East-Central Front 
Western Front

Participated in the defense of the Korean Demilitarized Zone, July 1953 - April 1955

Relocated during April 1955 to Camp Pendleton, California

1965 - 1993

Deployed during June 1965 to Okinawa

Participated in the Vietnam War, March 1966 - April 1971, operating from 
Chu Lai
Da Nang
An Hoa
Quang Tri
Phu Bai

Relocated during April 1971 to Camp Pendleton, California

Placed under the operational control of the 1st Force Service Support Group, Fleet Marine Force, on 30 March 1976

Participated in Operations Desert Shield and Desert Storm, Southwest Asia, August 1990 - April 1991

Participated in Operation Restore Hope, Somalia, December 1992 - January 1993

2003 - PRESENT

Deployed during February 2003 to Kuwait in support of Operation Enduring Freedom

Participated in Operation Iraqi Freedom, Iraq, March - September 2003 and February - September 2004

Elements participated in Operation Iraqi Freedom, Iraq, 2004 - 2009

1st Force Service Support Group (FSSG) was redesignated as 1st Marine Logistics Group (MLG), 21 October 2005

Elements participated in Operation Enduring Freedom, Afghanistan, 2009 - 2014

Elements participated in Operation Border Support, Southwestern U.S., November 2018 - February 2019 and April - September 2019

Elements attached in support of Special Purpose Marine Air Ground Task Force (SPMAGTF) Crisis Response US CENTCOM participated in Operation Allies Refuge, January - November 2021

Honors and awards 
Presidential Unit Citation Streamer with one Silver and three Bronze Stars

World War II
Guadalcanal - 1942 
Peleliu, Ngesbus - 1944 
Okinawa - 1945

Korea 
1950  
1951

Vietnam 
1966 - 1967 
1967 - 1968
Iraq

 2003

Joint Meritorious Unit Award Streamer 
Somalia 1992 - 1993

Navy Unit Commendation Streamer with one Bronze Star 
Korea 1952 - 1953 
Southwest Asia 1990 - 1997

Meritorious Unit Commendation Streamer with two Bronze Stars 
Vietnam 1968 - 1969 
1984 - 1986 
1995 - 1997

American Defense Service Streamer with one Bronze Star

Asiatic-Pacific Campaign Streamer with one Silver and one Bronze Star

World War II Victory Streamer

Navy Occupation Service Streamer with "Asia"

China Service Streamer

National Defense Service Streamer with three Bronze Stars

Korean Service Streamer with two Silver Stars

Armed Forces Expeditionary Streamer

Vietnam Service Streamer with two Silver and two Bronze Stars

Southwest Asia Service Streamer with two Bronze Stars

Afghanistan Campaign Streamer with one Bronze Star

Iraq Campaign Streamer with three Bronze Stars

Global War on Terrorism Expeditionary Streamer

Global War on Terrorism Service Streamer

Korean Presidential Unit Citation Streamer

Vietnam Cross of Gallantry with Palm Streamer

Vietnam Meritorious Unit Citation Civil Actions Streamer

See also

 Medical Corps (United States Navy)
 Navy Dental Corps
 Navy Nurse Corps
 Navy Medical Service Corps
 Hospital corpsman
 List of United States Marine Corps battalions

External links
 1st Medical Battalion's official website

Med 1